Things named after an American mathematician John Milnor:
 Barratt–Milnor sphere
 Fáry–Milnor theorem
 Milnor conjecture in algebraic K-theory
 Milnor conjecture in knot theory
 Milnor conjecture concerning manifolds with nonnegative Ricci curvature
 Milnor construction
 Milnor K-theory
 Milnor fibration
 Milnor invariants
 Milnor manifold
 Milnor map
 Milnor–Moore theorem
 Milnor number
 Milnor ring
 Milnor sphere
 Milnor theorem
 Milnor–Thurston kneading theory
 Milnor Frame concerning left invariant metrics on three-dimensional Lie groups
 Milnor–Wood inequality
 Švarc–Milnor lemma

Milnor